Santiago Iglesias Valdez (born 22 May 1993) is an Argentine rugby union footballer who plays as a hooker for Uni Tucumán. Despite only earning two caps for the Argentina national rugby union team (the Pumas) in the Tier 2 rugby tournament, South American Rugby Championship, he was selected by new head coach Daniel Hourcade for the Pumas 2013 end-of-year rugby union tests to Europe to face England, Wales and Italy.

References

1993 births
Living people
Argentine rugby union players
Rugby union hookers
Argentina international rugby union players
Universitario Rugby Club de Tucumán players
Rugby union players from Buenos Aires
Pampas XV players